Varendra University (VU) is a private university in Rajshahi, Bangladesh. It obtained approval from the Ministry of Education on March 14, 2012, and from the University Grants Commission (UGC) on March 20, 2012, under the Private University Act of 1992 and was the first UGC approved private university in Rajshahi. founders is Hafizur Rahman Khan, Chairman VU Trust.

Faculties 
There are 12 departments under seven faculties:

Faculty of Engineering and Technology
 Department of Computer Science and Engineering
 Department of Electrical and Electronic Engineering

Faculty of Pharmacy
 Department of Pharmacy
 Department of Public Health

Faculty of Public Health
 Department of Public Health

Faculty of Business
 Department of Business Administration

Faculty Law
 Department of Law & Human Rights

Faculty of Arts
 Department of English

Faculty of Social Science
 Department of Economics
 Department of Sociology 
 Department of Journalism, Communication and Media Studies
 Department of Political Science
Department of Islamic History

Online admission 
The university facilitates online admission for the benefit of applicants from distant areas.

Campus
The permanent campus of Varendra University situated at Kharkhari Bypass,Rajshahi is under constraction.

Facilities
Air-Conditioned classrooms with multimedia, broadband and Wi-Fi, UGC Digital Library, informative website, Education ERP, CCTV security system, generators and water filters.

Library
Varendra University has five libraries enriched with around 7000 books. Students benefit through the library facilities and have the option to finish their assignments/coursework with help from the books in the library.

Future permanent campus
A future permanent campus will be on 18 acres of land at Kharkhari, Paba Upazila (adjacent to Rajshahi City).

Extra-curricular activities
Study tours, seminars, debates and contests, participation in national and international, competitions, career center, parents' day, social awareness activities for deprived people, observance of national days and celebrations, picnic, indoor/outdoor games, cultural program.

References

External links

 

Private universities in Bangladesh
Organisations based in Rajshahi
Education in Rajshahi
Educational institutions established in 2012
2012 establishments in Bangladesh